Adriel O. Hampton (born 1978) is an American entrepreneur, strategist, and political figure from California. Hampton runs The Adriel Hampton Group, a digital advertising agency dedicated to supporting progressive causes. In 2020, he co-founded New Noise Works, a video game studio that distributes 60 percent of revenue to activists and mutual aid organizations. Additionally, Hampton is the founder of The Really Online Lefty League political action committee (PAC).

Earlier in his career, Hampton co-founded the analytics startup Pinpoint Predictive, the podcast Gov 2.0 Radio, and the progressive Facebook community Really American. He was an early member of the organizing software company NationBuilder. In 2009, Hampton became the first person to launch a congressional candidacy via Twitter.

Hampton is noted as a critic of Facebook's political advertising policies, arguing that the social media giant doesn't do enough to combat false political advertising on its platform. Hampton announced his candidacy for Governor of California in the 2022 election as a progressive candidate, but withdrew from the race before the filing deadline.

Early life and education 
Hampton was born in Modesto, California and was homeschooled. He is a citizen of the Chickasaw Nation. He worked as editor-in-chief of The Impact newspaper at San Joaquin Delta College, and graduated from University of California, Berkeley with a degree in Rhetoric. Hampton worked as an editor at the Lodi News-Sentinel, Alameda News Group, the San Francisco Examiner, and as an investigator for the San Francisco City Attorney's Office.

Founding of Government 2.0 

Hampton launched Government 2.0 Radio in March 2009 featuring an interview with Web 2.0 pioneer Tim O'Reilly. Hampton described the interview-based show as highlighting efforts to improve transparency and responsiveness in government at all levels. Hampton gained publicity for use of Twitter and Facebook in a 2009 campaign for the CA-10 seat to replace Rep. Ellen Tauscher in the House of Representatives.
 Hampton's campaign used collaborative editing, a form of crowdsourcing, to draft an anti-Drug War policy statement. Regarding this effort, he stated, “As Congressman, I’m going to practice what I preach. The job of a representative is to listen to and lead huge groups of people, and that means using new technologies to harness the ideas of many.”

2009 congressional run 

On March 18, 2009, Representative Ellen Tauscher (CA-10) was nominated by President Barack Obama to serve as Undersecretary of State for Arms Control and International Security. Hampton announced his candidacy for the subsequent special election to fill the seat, receiving national attention for being the first congressional candidate in history to announce their campaign launch on Twitter. During the campaign, Hampton prioritized support for single-payer healthcare, auditing the Federal Reserve, increased funding for public education, and capping interest rates. On foreign policy, Hampton stressed his support for removing U.S. troops from Afghanistan and Iraq.

During the campaign, Hampton was supported by former Chair of the San Francisco Democratic Party Matthew Rothschild and Matt Gonzalez, the former President of the San Francisco Board of Supervisors.

In the end, Hampton was defeated by John Garamendi, the former Lieutenant Governor of California.

Post-campaign work 

After his Congressional campaign, Hampton began working as Chief Organizer and Vice President of Business Development at NationBuilder, a Los Angeles tech startup that does work on, among other things, websites for politicians such as California Governor Jerry Brown and Los Angeles Mayor Eric Garcetti. In 2015, Hampton left NationBuilder and founded a consulting firm, The Adriel Hampton Group. Also in 2015, he co-founded and served as President of Pinpoint Predictive, a San Francisco startup pioneering predictive personality advertising. Adriel's consulting firm specializes in digital advertising and community building. Hampton's clients have included phone and email append provider Accurate Append, mobile canvassing app Ecanvasser, and the activist toolset Do Gooder. He is an adviser to VoterCircle.

The Really Online Lefty League PAC and opposition to Facebook 
The Really Online Lefty League (TROLL) is a political action committee (PAC) formed by Hampton. The rollout of the PAC, created in collaboration with the Institute for Progressive Memetics, included a fake advertisement for the Green New Deal. The PAC gained recognition for launching an advertisement describing conservative Senator Lindsey Graham as being in favor of Green New Deal legislation to highlight the issues stemming from Facebook's political advertising policies.

This decision was inspired by a congressional hearing in which Alexandria Ocasio-Cortez questioned Facebook CEO Mark Zuckerberg as to whether Facebook would be taking down ads from politicians that spread false information. Zuckerberg replied that they probably would not, leading to the PAC to run this ad to test Facebook's advertising policies.

Additionally, the political action committee was noted for putting up digital billboards along the Interstate 15 in Utah as well as in other states with a photo of Zuckerberg and President Donald Trump with the caption "Trump - Zuckerberg 2020" in order to raise awareness to the potential impact of Facebook's advertising policies in assisting Trump's reelection bid.

More recently, Hampton and TROLL, put out a YouTube ad against Congressman Ken Calvert in the election for California's 42nd congressional district.

2022 gubernatorial campaign 
On October 29, 2019, Hampton declared he was running for governor of California in order to run fake Facebook ads. Stating that "we have some pretty serious issues of corporations now basically running society and I think Facebook is the grossest example of that", Hampton pledged that his gubernatorial campaign would serve to highlight issues stemming from the platform. A spokesperson for Facebook has since responded to his candidacy, stating that "[Hampton] has made clear he registered as a candidate to get around our policies, so his content, including ads, will continue to be eligible for third-party fact-checking."

Despite Facebook's statement, Hampton successfully ran and promoted additional fake ads as a candidate, including one that suggested Sean Hannity was replacing Mike Pence as Donald Trump's running mate, and another where Mitch McConnell appeared to publicly support impeachment of Trump.

Hampton has declared that his campaign is a serious effort, not just a symbolic issue campaign. Hampton has stated that climate change played a major role in his decision to run for Governor, arguing that incumbent Gavin Newsom is tied too closely to the Pacific Gas and Electric Company. A supporter of Bernie Sanders's 2020 presidential campaign, CNN has described him a "socialist tech entrepreneur".

References

External links
Adriel Hampton for U.S. Congress, Official 2009 Congressional Campaign Website Archive
adrielhampton.com, Official Website

1978 births
Living people
People from Modesto, California
University of California, Berkeley alumni
Chickasaw
Chickasaw people
20th-century Native Americans
21st-century Native Americans